Christian J. Garcia (born August 24, 1985) is an American former professional baseball pitcher. Garcia pitched for the Washington Nationals of Major League Baseball in 2012.

Early life
Garcia attended Gulliver Preparatory School in Coral Gables, Florida. He played for the school's baseball team as a catcher and committed to attend the University of South Carolina on a baseball scholarship, intending to play for the South Carolina Gamecocks. He was a switch-hitting catcher as well as pitcher.

Professional career
The Yankees selected Garcia in the third round of the 2004 MLB Draft, and he made his professional debut in the Rookie-level Gulf Coast League (GCL) with the GCL Yankees. One of the top prospects in the GCL in 2004, Garcia was promoted to the Charleston RiverDogs of the Class A South Atlantic League in 2005. After returning to Charleston in 2006, the Yankees assigned him to the West Oahu CaneFires of the Arizona Fall League after the 2006 season.

Garcia experienced a torn ulnar collateral ligament (UCL) in his right elbow, which required Tommy John surgery in 2007. After missing the entire 2007 season, Garcia pitched to a 4–4 win–loss record and a 4.33 earned run average (ERA) with 74 strikeouts in  innings pitched between the GCL Yankees, Tampa Yankees of the Class A-Advanced Florida State League, and Trenton Thunder of Class AA Eastern League in 2008. The Yankees added Garcia to their 40 man roster after the 2008 season. Garcia experienced a recurrence of pain in his right elbow, which required his second elbow surgery, to repair a bone spur. His UCL tore again in 2010, which required his second Tommy John surgery in April 2010. The Yankees released him one month later.

The Washington Nationals signed him in July 2011. In 2012, he allowed only five earned runs in 45 appearances, for a combined ERA of 0.86 for the Harrisburg Senators of the Eastern League and Syracuse Chiefs of the Class AAA International League. On September 3, 2012, he was promoted to the major leagues. The following day, he made his major league debut, inducing a pop-up to end an inning.

Nationals manager Davey Johnson said on September 24 that the team may attempt to convert Garcia into a starter for the 2013 season, citing his fully developed repertoire of pitches.

Garcia spent most of the 2013 season on the disabled list with a torn wrist tendon, shoulder and hamstring injuries, with minor league rehab assignments at Class A Potomac, Class AA Harrisburg, and Class AAA Syracuse.

Garcia was released by the Nationals on June 25, 2014.

Pitching style
Garcia threw four pitches: a four-seam and two-seam fastball averaging about 96 mph, a sweeping knuckle curveball in the low 80s, and a changeup averaging about 87 mph. Garcia said he was inspired to learn the spike curveball grip from watching Mike Mussina pitch.

References

External links

1985 births
Living people
Baseball players from Miami
Major League Baseball pitchers
Washington Nationals players
Gulf Coast Yankees players
Charleston RiverDogs players
Tampa Yankees players
Trenton Thunder players
Auburn Doubledays players
Harrisburg Senators players
Syracuse Chiefs players